Watchmen: Motion Comic  is a 2008 American motion comic based on the 1986-87 DC Comics limited comic book series Watchmen by Alan Moore and Dave Gibbons.  The series consists of twelve abridged 25–30 minute segments, each based on and sharing a name with one of the twelve chapters of the book. All characters are voiced by actor Tom Stechschulte. It was released on DVD in March 2009 to coincide with the Watchmen film's release.

Plot

In October 1985, during the Soviet invasion of Afghanistan and on the eve of nuclear war, a depressed Rorschach, one of several outlawed vigilante superheroes, begins to investigate why all former masked superheroes are either dead or have declined.

Episodes

International broadcasters

References

External links

American alternate history films
The Stone Quarry films
Films based on works by Alan Moore
Films set in New York City
Films set in the 1980s
Mars in film
Adaptations of Watchmen
2008 science fiction films
American superhero films
Vietnam War films
Animated short films based on DC Comics
2008 direct-to-video films
2008 films
2000s American animated films